August Heinrich Rudolf Grisebach was a German botanist and phytogeographer. He was born in Hannover on 17 April 1814 and died in Göttingen on 9 May 1879.

Biography 

Grisebach studied at the Lyceum in Hanover, the cloister-school at Ilfeld, and the University of Göttingen. He graduated in medicine from the University of Berlin in 1836.
He undertook expeditions to Provence, Turkey, the Balkans, and Norway.
In 1837 he became associate professor and in 1847 full professor at the medical faculty in Göttingen and was named director of the botanical garden there in 1875.
While his main fields of interest were phytogeography and systematics, especially the Gentianaceae and Malpighiaceae, he considered his Flora of the British West Indian Islands his most important work.
Much of his collection, especially the types of species described by him, are housed at the Göttingen University Herbarium. His taxonomic classification is set out in his Grundriss der systematischen Botanik (1854). His son Eduard was an author, lawyer and diplomat.

Selected works 

  (Grundr. Syst. Bot.: Schema p. 68)
 Die Vegetation der Erde nach Ihrer Klimatischen Anordnung (The Earth's vegetation after its climatic arrangement), 1872 (1st Edition), 1884 (2nd Edition).
 Flora of the British West Indian Islands, Lovell Reeve & Co., London, 1864

References

Bibliography 

 Some Biogeographers, Evolutionists and Ecologists: Chrono-Biographical Sketches
 Detailed biography at the Allgemeine Deutsche Biographie
  Biographical entry in Meyers Konversationslexikon
 Obituary in Botanische Zeitung 1879

External links 
 Complete bibliography on WorldCat
 Plantae Wrightianae e Cuba Orientali at Botanicus
 Catalogus plantarum cubensium (Catalog of Plants of Cuba) 1866, at Botanicus
 Plantae Wrightianae e Cuba Orientali by A. Grisebach at the Biodiversity Heritage Library.
 Grisebach, A. (1857) Systematische Untersuchungen über die Vegetation der Karaiben, insbesondere der Insel Guadeloupe at the Biodiversity Heritage Library.
 Malpighiaceae/Grisebach

German phytogeographers
1814 births
1879 deaths
German taxonomists
Scientists from Hanover
People from the Kingdom of Hanover
University of Göttingen alumni
19th-century German botanists